The women's 10,000 metres at the 2010 African Championships in Athletics were held on July 31.

Results

External links
Results

10000
10,000 metres at the African Championships in Athletics
2010 in women's athletics